Judge Barker may refer to:

J. Campbell Barker (born 1980), judge of the United States District Court for the Eastern District of Texas
Pamela Barker (born 1957), judge of the United States District Court for the Northern District of Ohio
Sarah Evans Barker (born 1943), judge of the United States District Court for the Southern District of Indiana
William J. Barker (1886–1968), judge of the United States District Court for the Southern District of Florida

See also
Justice Barker (disambiguation)